Wafra is an impact crater in the Elysium quadrangle of Mars. It was named after the town of Wafra, southern Kuwait, in 2013.

References 

Impact craters on Mars
Elysium quadrangle